Alex Atkins is an American football coach. He is currently the offensive coordinator for the Florida State Seminoles.

Playing career
Atkins was a four-year starter on the offensive line at guard for UT-Martin. He received all-conference honors twice.

Coaching career

Early coaching career
Atkins began his coaching career at his alma mater, UT-Martin in 2007 working as a graduate assistant. In 2008 he was promoted and given a position and began coaching the tight ends. In 2009  he served as a graduate assistant for Marshall. In 2010 he joined  Itawamba Community College in Mississippi  as the team's offensive line coach and recruiting coordinator. In 2012 and 2013 he worked as the offensive line coach for Chattanooga. Atkins arrived at Georgia Southern in 2014 once again working with the offensive line. He left after the 2015 season.

Tulane
In 2016 Atkins went to Tulane as the assistant head coach and offensive line coach. In 2018 he was given the additional title of run game coordinator.

Charlotte
In 2019 Atkins served as the offensive coordinator and offensive line coach for the Charlotte 49ers.

Florida State
In 2020 Atkins joined Florida State as the team's offensive line coach. In 2022 he was named the team's offensive coordinator.

References

Living people
Year of birth missing (living people)
Florida State Seminoles football coaches
Coaches of American football from Illinois
Sportspeople from Chicago
UT Martin Skyhawks football players